The 75th New York State Legislature, consisting of the New York State Senate and the New York State Assembly, met from January 6 to April 16, 1852, during the second year of Washington Hunt's governorship, in Albany.

Background
Under the provisions of the New York Constitution of 1846, 32 Senators were elected in single-seat senatorial districts for a two-year term, the whole Senate being renewed biennially. The senatorial districts (except those in New York City) were made up of entire counties. 128 Assemblymen were elected in single-seat districts to a one-year term, the whole Assembly being renewed annually. The Assembly districts were made up of entire towns, or city wards, forming a contiguous area, all in the same county. The City and County of New York was divided into four senatorial districts, and 16 Assembly districts.

At this time there were two major political parties: the Democratic Party and the Whig Party.

Elections
The New York state election, 1851 was held on November 4.

Of the eight statewide elective offices up for election, six were carried by the Democrats, and two by the Whigs.

16 Democrats and 16 Whigs were elected for a two-year term to the State Senate.

65 Whigs and 63 Democrats were elected to the State Assembly.

Sessions
The Legislature met for the regular session at the Old State Capitol in Albany on January 6, 1852; and adjourned on April 16.

Jonas C. Heartt (Whig) was elected Speaker with 63 votes against 59 for Israel T. Hatch (Dem.).

Ira P. Barnes was elected Clerk of the Senate by resolution, with a vote of 16 to 15; Senator Dan S. Wright (W) did not vote. The same vote was given for Charles Lee as Sergeant-at-Arms of the Senate. Doorkeeper of the Senate A. N. Beardsley was elected with the casting vote of Lt. Gov. Sanford E. Church.

On January 26, Edwin D. Morgan (W) was elected president pro tempore of the Senate.

On March 24, William McMurray (D) was elected president pro tempore of the Senate.

State Senate

Districts

 1st District: Queens, Richmond and Suffolk counties
 2nd District: Kings County
 3rd District: 1st, 2nd, 3rd, 4th, 5th and 6th wards of New York City
 4th District: 7th, 10th, 13th and 17th wards of New York City
 5th District: 8th, 9th and 14th wards of New York City
 6th District: 11th, 12th, 15th, 16th, 18th, 19th, 20th, 21st and 22nd wards of New York City
 7th District: Putnam,  Rockland and Westchester counties
 8th District: Columbia and Dutchess counties
 9th District: Orange and Sullivan counties
 10th District: Greene and Ulster counties
 11th District: Albany and Schenectady counties
 12th District: Rensselaer County
 13th District: Saratoga and Washington counties
 14th District: Clinton, Essex and Warren counties
 15th District: Franklin and St. Lawrence counties
 16th District: Fulton, Hamilton, Herkimer and Montgomery counties
 17th District: Delaware and Schoharie counties
 18th District: Chenango and Otsego counties
 19th District: Oneida County
 20th District: Madison and Oswego counties
 21st District: Jefferson and Lewis counties
 22nd District: Onondaga County
 23rd District: Broome, Cortland and Tioga counties
 24th District: Cayuga and Wayne counties
 25th District: Seneca, Tompkins and Yates counties
 26th District: Chemung and Steuben counties
 27th District: Monroe County
 28th District: Genesee, Niagara and Orleans counties
 29th District: Livingston and Ontario counties
 30th District: Allegany and Wyoming counties
 31st District: Erie County
 32nd District: Cattaraugus and Chautauqua counties

Note: There are now 62 counties in the State of New York. The counties which are not mentioned in this list had not yet been established, or sufficiently organized, the area being included in one or more of the abovementioned counties.

Members
The asterisk (*) denotes members of the previous Legislature who continued in office as members of this Legislature.

Employees
 Clerk: Ira P. Barnes
 Sergeant-at-Arms: Charles Lee
 Doorkeeper: A. N. Beardsley
 Assistant Doorkeeper: George Read

State Assembly

Assemblymen
The asterisk (*) denotes members of the previous Legislature who continued as members of this Legislature.

Party affiliations follow the vote on Speaker.

Employees
 Clerk: Richard U. Sherman
 Sergeant-at-Arms: Joseph W. Caldwell
 Doorkeeper: Nathan Chamberlin
 First Assistant Doorkeeper: Archibald Smith
 Second Assistant Doorkeeper: Asa Baldwin

Notes

Sources
 The New York Civil List compiled by Franklin Benjamin Hough (Weed, Parsons and Co., 1858) [pg. 109 for Senate districts; pg. 137 for senators; pg. 148–157 for Assembly districts; pg. 242ff for assemblymen]
 Journal of the Senate (75th Session) (1852)
 Journal of the Assembly (75th Session) (1852)

075
1852 in New York (state)
1852 U.S. legislative sessions